Maliye Milli Piyango Spor Kulübü is a Turkish sports club from Ankara active in basketball, handball, taekwondo and volleyball.

The club's women's handball section won four national championships between 2007 and 2010. Having failed to reach the Champions League's group stage in its four appearances in the competition's qualification tournament, its major success in EHF competitions to date was reaching the 2012 EHF Cup's quarterfinals. The male team also plays in the national premier league.

Titles

Women's handball
 Super League
 2007, 2008, 2009, 2010

Men's Volleyball
 CEV Challenge Cup
 Third (1): 2017-18

Squads

Women's handball
 02  Nergiz Türkay
 03  Vinka Vlahović
 05  Ceren Salur
 07  Duygu Aydogan
 08  Gülsüm Mercimek
 09  Buket Keskin
 10  Cigdem Özcan
 11  Selma Akgül Pekmutlu
 15  Sinem Eyövge Hosgör
 22  Jelena Pirsl
 25  Yuliya Snopova
 30  Anastasia Sinitsyna
 35  Derya Tinkaoglu
 78  Neslihan Yakupoglu

Notable former players
 Derya Tınkaoğlu (born 1988)

References 

Turkish handball clubs
Volleyball clubs in Ankara
Multi-sport clubs in Turkey